Am Dam Des was a children's television series produced at the ORF studios in Vienna, Austria between 1975 and 1993. It was screened weekdays on ORF 1.

This live-action show was presented as 25-minute episodes, with an educational theme and different sections, hosted by Thomas Brezina, Ingrid Riegler, Edith Rolles and Kurt Shalaby. They entertained children with poetry, stories, arts and crafts and various games.

In 1977, Christoph Waltz joined the show as a singer welcoming the New Year.

See also 
List of Austrian television series

References

External links 
 

Austrian children's television series
1975 Austrian television series debuts
1993 Austrian television series endings
1970s Austrian television series
1980s Austrian television series
1990s Austrian television series
ORF (broadcaster) original programming
German-language television shows
Austrian television shows featuring puppetry
Television shows about clowns